Jordan Klepper Solves Guns is an hour-long Comedy Central special starring comedian Jordan Klepper, a correspondent on The Daily Show. It premiered on June 11, 2017. In it, Klepper plays a satirical depiction of a self-righteous liberal journalist seeking to confiscate all guns in America. Klepper, along with the special's writers, spent six months researching guns in America before they finished the special.

References

External links 
 
 

Comedy Central original programming
2017 television specials